Khmelnytskyi Oblast Football Federation is a football governing body in the region of Khmelnytskyi Oblast, Ukraine. The federation is a member of the Regional Council of FFU and the collective member of the FFU itself.

Previous Champions

1939    FC Dynamo Kamianets-Podilskyi
1940    FC Dynamo Kamianets-Podilskyi (2)
1953    FC Dynamo Proskuriv
1954    FC Burevisnyk Kamianets-Podilskyi
1955    FC Burevisnyk Kamianets-Podilskyi (2)
1956    FC Burevisnyk Kamianets-Podilskyi (3)
1957    FC Burevisnyk Kamianets-Podilskyi (4)
1958    FC Burevisnyk Kamianets-Podilskyi (5)
1959    FC Burevisnyk Kamianets-Podilskyi (6)
1960    FC Podillya Kamianets-Podilskyi
1961    FC Podillya Kamianets-Podilskyi (2)
1962    FC Podillya Kamianets-Podilskyi (3)
1963    FC Podillya Kamianets-Podilskyi (4)
1964    FC Podillya Kamianets-Podilskyi (5)
1965    FC Burevisnyk Kamianets-Podilskyi (7)
1966    FC Podillya Kamianets-Podilskyi (6)
1967    FC Podillya Kamianets-Podilskyi (7)
1968    FC Enerhiya Khmelnytskyi
1969    FC Mebelnyk Khmelnytskyi
1970    FC Sluch Krasyliv
1971    FC Elektron (Podillya) Kamianets-Podilskyi (8)
1972    FC Elektron (Podillya) Kamianets-Podilskyi (9)
1973    FC Sluch Krasyliv (2)
1974    FC Sluch Krasyliv (3)
1975    FC Burevisnyk Kamianets-Podilskyi (8)
1976    FC Enerhiya Khmelnytskyi (2)
1977    FC Burevisnyk Kamianets-Podilskyi (9)
1978    Khmelnytskyi National University
1979    Khmelnytskyi National University (2)
1980    FC Sluch Krasyliv (4)
1981    FC Sluch Krasyliv (5)
1982    FC Kation Khmelnytskyi
1983    FC Korchahinets Shepetivka
1984    
1985    
1986    FC Traktor Khmelnytskyi
1987    FC Proton Netishyn
1988    FC Traktor Khmelnytskyi (2)
1989    FC Strila Volochysk
1990    FC Iskra Teofipol
1991    FC Zbruch Volochysk (2)
1992    FC Advis Khmelnytskyi (3)
1992-93 FC Advis Khmelnytskyi (4)
1993    FC Advis Khmelnytskyi (5)
1994    FC Nyva-Tekstylnyk Dunayivtsi
1995    FC Impuls Kamianets-Podilskyi
1996    FC Enerhetyk Netishyn (2)
1997    FC Advis Khmelnytskyi (6)
1998    FC Advis Khmelnytskyi (7)
1999    FC Dynamo-Orbita Kamianets-Podilskyi (3)
2000    FC Zbruch Volochysk (3)
2001    FC Podillya-2 Khmelnytskyi (2)
2002    FC Iskra Teofipol (2)
2003    FC Iskra Teofipol (3)
2004    FC Nyva-Tekstylnyk Dunayivtsi (2)
2005    FC Zbruch Volochysk (4)
2006    FC Budfarfor Slavuta
2007    FC Iskra Teofipol (4)
2008    FC Zbruch-Astarta Volochysk (5)
2009    FC Zbruch-Ahro Volochysk (6)
2010    FC Podillya Khmelnytskyi (3)
2011    FC Zbruch Volochysk (7)
2012    FC Zbruch Volochysk (8)
2013    FC Sluch Starokostiantyniv
2014    FC Zbruch Volochysk (9)
2015    FC Zbruch Volochysk (10)
2016    FC Ahrobiznes Volochysk
2017    FC Ahrobiznes-2 Volochysk (2)
2018    FC Sluch Krasyliv (6)
2019    FC Epitsentr Dunayivtsi (3)
2020    FC Ahrobiznes Nova Ushytsia

Top winners
 10 - FC Zbruch (Strila) Volochysk
 9 - FC Elektron (Podillya) Kamianets-Podilskyi
 9 - FC Burevisnyk Kamianets-Podilskyi
 7 - FC Advis (Traktor) Khmelnytskyi
 6 - FC Sluch Krasyliv
 4 - FC Iskra Teofipol
 3 - 3 clubs (Podillia, Dynamo K-P, Epitsentr)
 2 - 4 clubs (Enerhetyk N., KhNU, Enerhiya Kh., Ahrobiznes (Ahrobiznes-2))
 1 - 8 clubs

 Notes:
Officially Ahrobiznes Volochysk and Zbruch Volochysk is not one and the same club. For more details, see the article on FC Ahrobiznes Volochysk.

Professional clubs
 FC Podillya Khmelnytskyi (Dynamo), 1946, 1960-2004, 2007-2014, 2016-2021
 FC Podillia Kamianets-Podilskyi, 1968-1970
 FC Temp Shepetivka, 1991-1995
 FC Advis Khmelnytskyi, 1994-1995 (one season)
 Ratusha Kamianets-Podilskyi, 1996 (half a season)
 FC Krasyliv, 2000-2007
 FC Ahrobiznes Volochysk, 2017-2021
 FC Epitsentr Kamianets-Podilskyi (Dunaivtsi), 2020-

See also
 FFU Council of Regions

References

External links
 Khmelnytskyi Oblast Football Federation

Football in the regions of Ukraine
Football governing bodies in Ukraine
Sport in Khmelnytskyi Oblast